Federico Mussini (born March 12, 1996) is an Italian basketball player for Pallalcesto Amatori Udine of the Italian Serie A2 Basket, second tier national championship.

Career

Federico Mussini made his debut for Grissin Bon Reggio Emilia in May 2013 against Pallacanestro Virtus Roma, but only played one minute.

In the 2013-14 season, Mussini only played in 9 total games for Reggio Emilia, but he played 11.6 minutes per game on the way to Reggio Emilia winning the 2013–14 EuroChallenge.

Mussini was loaned to Stella Azzurra Roma for the 2013-14 Nike International Junior Tournament, where he was named to the All-Tournament team after averaging 19.2 points, 3.2 rebounds, 1.8 assists, and 2.5 steals.

In the 2014-15 season, Mussini saw increased role for Reggio Emilia as a back-up point guard to Andrea Cinciarini.

With Mussini drawing strong interest from the NCAA, Reggio Emilia reportedly offered him a 5-year contract. Mussini said that he planned to decide his future by the end of April 2015 with Gonzaga, St. John's, and Davidson among the colleges he would most likely choose if he decides to leave Reggio Emilia.

On June 29, 2015, Mussini committed to play college basketball for the St. John's Red Storm.

On June 6, 2017, Mussini officially left St. John's to return in Italy and signed a three-year deal with Pallacanestro Reggiana.

On March 30, 2018, Mussini officially joined Pallacanestro Trieste on loan for 2017–18 Serie A2 season.

On July 10, 2018, Mussini returned to Reggiana. He finished last season on loan in Trieste conquering the promotion in LBA.

On July 5, 2019, he has signed with VL Pesaro of the Lega Basket Serie A (LBA).

On October 9, 2020, while the season had just started, Mussini signed a short-term contract with Trieste, which was facing many injury problems.

On January 7, 2021, he signed for Pallalcesto Amatori Udine in the Serie A2 Basket, second tier national championship.

International career

Mussini was invited to play in the 2012 Jordan Brand Classic where he led the White International team to victory over the Blue International team with a game-high 21 points, 4 rebounds, 4 assists, and 2 steals.

Mussini joined the Under-16 Italian national team in 2012, where he led Italy to fourth place and was named to the All-Tournament team. Mussini averaged 14.6 points, 3.8 rebounds, 2.1 assists, 1.8 steals, along with a tournament high 52.2% 3-point field goal percentage.

Mussini was a member of the 2014 Italian Under-18 team that played in the Albert Schweitzer Tournament, where he led Italy to first place over USA. Mussini had 20 points, 7 rebounds, and 6 assists in the championship game. Mussini was named to the All-Tournament team after averaging 20.3 points, 3.9 rebounds, 3.4 assists, and 1.4 steals.

Mussini played for the Under-18 Italian national team in 2014, where he led Italy to sixth place and was named to the All-Tournament team. Mussini averaged 22.6 points, 4.0 rebounds, 2.1 assists, 1.4 steals, and 42.9% 3-point field goal percentage. Mussini led the tournament field in points per game, field goals made per game (7.6), 3 point field goals made per game (3.0), field goals attempted per game (16.2), and 3 point field goals attempted per game (7.0).

In 2015, Mussini was invited to play for the World Select Team in the Nike Hoop Summit where he scored 9 points and dished out 3 assists in a winning effort offer the USA Select Team.

Statistics

College statistics

|-
| style="text-align:left;"| 2015–16
| style="text-align:left;"| St. John's
| 32  || 23 || 29.3 || .338 || .304 || .862 || 2.4 || 2.2 || 1.2 || 0.1 || 10.7
|-
| style="text-align:left;"| 2016–17
| style="text-align:left;"| St. John's
| 30  || 2  || 19.3 || .410 || .427 || .854 || 1.7 || 0.9 || 0.6 || 0.0 || 8.2

References

External links
 St. John's Red Storm profile
 Eurocup Profile

1996 births
Living people
Competitors at the 2018 Mediterranean Games
Italian expatriate basketball people in the United States
Italian men's basketball players
Lega Basket Serie A players
Mediterranean Games medalists in basketball
Mediterranean Games silver medalists for Italy
Pallacanestro Reggiana players
Pallacanestro Trieste players
Point guards
Sportspeople from Reggio Emilia
St. John's Red Storm men's basketball players